David Glasgow Farragut (also spelled Glascoe; July 5, 1801 – August 14, 1870) was a flag officer of the United States Navy during the American Civil War. He was the first rear admiral, vice admiral, and admiral in the United States Navy. He is remembered for his order at the Battle of Mobile Bay, usually paraphrased as "Damn the torpedoes, full speed ahead" in U.S. Navy tradition.

Born near Knoxville, Tennessee, Farragut was fostered by naval officer David Porter after the death of his mother. When he was 11 years old, Farragut served in the War of 1812 under the command of his adoptive father. He received his first command in 1823, at the age of 22, and went on to participate in anti-piracy operations in the Caribbean Sea. He then served in the Mexican–American War under the command of Matthew C. Perry, participating in the blockade of Tuxpan. After the war, he oversaw the construction of the Mare Island Navy Yard (now Mare Island Naval Shipyard), which was the first U.S. Navy base established on the Pacific Ocean.

Though Farragut resided in Norfolk, Virginia, prior to the Civil War, he was a Southern Unionist who strongly opposed Southern secession and remained loyal to the Union after the outbreak of the Civil War. Despite some doubts about Farragut's loyalty, Farragut was assigned command of an attack on the important Confederate port city of New Orleans. After defeating the Confederates at the Battle of Forts Jackson and St. Philip, Farragut captured New Orleans in April 1862. He was promoted to rear admiral after the battle and helped extend Union control up along the Mississippi River, participating in the siege of Port Hudson. With the Union in control of the Mississippi, Farragut led a successful attack on Mobile Bay, home to the last major Confederate port on the Gulf of Mexico. Farragut was promoted to admiral following the end of the Civil War and remained on active duty until his death in 1870.

Early life

James Glasgow Farragut was born in 1801 to George Farragut (born Jordi Farragut Mesquida, 1755–1817), a Spanish Balearic merchant captain from the Mediterranean island of Menorca, and his wife Elizabeth (née Shine, 1765–1808), of North Carolina Scotch-Irish American descent, at Lowe's Ferry on the Holston River in Tennessee. It was a few miles southeast of Campbell's Station, near Knoxville.

After serving in the Spanish merchant marine, George Farragut immigrated to North America in 1776 and served as a naval officer during the American Revolutionary War. He was first with the South Carolina Navy, then with the Continental Navy.  George and Elizabeth moved west to Tennessee after his service in the Revolution, where he operated Lowe's Ferry and served as a cavalry officer in the Tennessee militia. 

In 1805, George accepted a position at the U.S. port of New Orleans.  He traveled there first and his family followed in a  flatboat guided by hired rivermen. It was four-year-old James's first voyage.  The family was still living in New Orleans when Elizabeth died of yellow fever. George Farragut made plans to place the young children with friends and family who could better care for them.

In 1808, after his mother's death, James agreed to live with United States Navy officer David Porter, whose father had served with George Farragut during the Revolution. In 1812, he adopted the name "David" in honor of his foster father, with whom he went to sea late in 1810. David Farragut grew up in a naval family, with  foster brothers David Dixon Porter, a future Civil War admiral, and William D. Porter, who became a Commodore.

Career

Farragut's naval career began as a midshipman when he was nine years old, and continued for 60 years until his death at the age of 69. This included service in several wars, most notably during the American Civil War, where he gained fame for winning several decisive naval battles.

War of 1812
Farragut's naval career began when he was added to the U.S. Navy's rolls with the rank of "boy" in the spring of 1810. Through the influence of his foster father, Farragut was warranted a midshipman in the U.S. Navy on December 17, 1810, at the age of nine. A prize master by the age of 11, Farragut fought in the War of 1812, serving under Captain Porter, his foster father. While serving aboard the frigate , Farragut participated in the capture of HMS Alert on August 13, 1812, He helped to establish America's first naval base and colony in the Pacific, named Fort Madison, during the ill-fated Nuku Hiva Campaign in the Marquesas Islands. At the same time, the Americans battled the hostile tribes on the islands with the help of their Te I'i allies.

Farragut was 11 years old when, during the War of 1812, he was given the assignment to bring a ship captured by the Essex safely to port. He was wounded and captured while serving on the Essex during the engagement at Valparaíso Bay, Chile, against the British on March 28, 1814.

West Indies
He served in the Mosquito Fleet, a fleet of ships fitted out to fight pirates in the Caribbean Sea. After learning his old captain, Commodore Porter, would be commander of the fleet, he asked for, and received, orders to serve aboard Greyhound, one of the smaller vessels, commanded by John Porter, brother of David Porter. On February 14, 1823, the fleet set sail for the West Indies where, for the next six months, they would drive the pirates off the sea, and rout them from their hiding places in among the islands. He was executive officer aboard the Experiment during its campaign in the West Indies fighting pirates. Farragut was promoted to lieutenant in 1825.

Mexican–American War
In 1847, Farragut, now a commander, took command of the sloop-of-war  when she was recommissioned at Norfolk Navy Yard in Norfolk, Virginia. Assigned to the Home Squadron for service in the Mexican–American War, Saratoga departed Norfolk on March 29, 1847, bound for the Gulf of Mexico under Farragut's command and upon arriving off Veracruz, Mexico, on April 26, 1847, reported to the squadron's commander, Commodore Matthew C. Perry, for duty. On April 29, Perry ordered Farragut to sail Saratoga 150 nautical miles (173 miles; 278 km) to the north to blockade Tuxpan, where she operated from April 30 to July 12 before Farragut returned to Veracruz. About two weeks later, Farragut began a round-trip voyage to carry dispatches to Tabasco, returning to Veracruz on August 11, 1847. On September 1, 1847, Farragut and Saratoga returned to blockade duty off Tuxpan, remaining there for two months despite a yellow fever outbreak on board. Farragut then brought the ship back to Veracruz and, after a month there, got underway for the Pensacola Navy Yard in Pensacola, Florida, where Saratoga arrived on January 6, 1848, disembarked all of her seriously sick patients at the base hospital, and replenished her stores. On January 31, 1848, Farragut took the ship out of Pensacola bound for New York City, arriving there on February 19. Saratoga was decommissioned there on February 26, 1848.

Mare Island Navy Yard
In 1853, Secretary of the Navy James C. Dobbin selected Commander David G. Farragut to create Mare Island Navy Yard near San Francisco in San Pablo Bay. In August 1854, Farragut was called to Washington from his post as assistant inspector of ordnance at Norfolk, Virginia. President Franklin Pierce congratulated Farragut on his naval career and the task he was to undertake. On September 16, 1854, Commander Farragut arrived to oversee the building of the Mare Island Navy Yard at Vallejo, California, which became the port for ship repairs on the West Coast. Captain Farragut commissioned Mare Island on July 16, 1858. Farragut returned to a hero's welcome at Mare Island on August 11, 1859.

Civil War service

Though living in Norfolk, Virginia, prior to the American Civil War, Farragut made it clear to all who knew him that he regarded secession as treason. Just before the war's outbreak, Farragut moved with his Virginian-born wife to Hastings-on-Hudson, a small town just outside New York City.

He offered his services to the Union, and was initially given a seat on the Naval Retirement Board. Offered a command by his foster brother, David Dixon Porter, for a special assignment, he hesitated upon learning the target might be Norfolk. As he had friends and relatives living there, he was relieved to learn the target was changed to his former childhood home of New Orleans.

Farragut was appointed under secret instructions on February 3, 1862, to command the Gulf Blockading Squadron, sailing from Hampton Roads on the screw steamer , bearing 25 guns, which he made his flagship, accompanied by a fleet of 17 ships. He reached the mouth of the Mississippi River, near Confederate forts St. Philip and Jackson, situated opposite one another along the banks of the river, with a combined armament of more than 100 heavy guns and a complement of 700 men. Now aware of Farragut's approach, the Confederates had amassed a fleet of 16 gunboats just outside New Orleans.

On April 18, Farragut ordered the mortar boats, under the command of Porter, to commence bombardment on the two forts, inflicting considerable damage, but not enough to compel the Confederates to surrender. After two days of heavy bombardment, Farragut ran past forts Jackson and St. Philip and the Chalmette batteries to take the city and port of New Orleans on April 29, a decisive event in the war.

Congress honored him by creating the rank of rear admiral on July 16, 1862, a rank never before used in the U.S. Navy. Before this time, the American Navy had resisted the rank of admiral, preferring the term "flag officer", to distinguish the rank from the traditions of the European navies.  Farragut was promoted to rear admiral along with 13 other officers – three others on the active list and ten on the retired list.

Later that year, Farragut passed the batteries defending Vicksburg, Mississippi, but had no success there.  A makeshift Confederate ironclad forced his flotilla of 38 ships to withdraw in July 1862.

While an aggressive commander, Farragut was not always cooperative. At the siege of Port Hudson, the plan was that Farragut's flotilla would pass by the guns of the Confederate stronghold with the help of a diversionary land attack by the Army of the Gulf, commanded by General Nathaniel Banks, to commence at 8:00 a.m. on March 15, 1863. Farragut unilaterally decided to move the timetable up to 9:00 p.m. on March 14, and initiated his run past the guns before Union ground forces were in position. The consequently uncoordinated attack allowed the Confederates to concentrate on Farragut's flotilla and inflict heavy damage to his warships.

Farragut's flotilla was forced to retreat with only two ships able to pass the heavy cannon of the Confederate bastion. After surviving the gauntlet, Farragut played no further part in the battle for Port Hudson, and General Banks was left to continue the siege without the advantage of naval support. The Union Army made two major attacks on the fort; both were repulsed with heavy losses. Farragut's flotilla was splintered, yet was able to blockade the mouth of the Red River with the two remaining warships; he could not efficiently patrol the section of the Mississippi between Port Hudson and Vicksburg. Farragut's decision proved costly to the Union Navy and the Union Army, which suffered its highest casualty rate of the war at Port Hudson.

Vicksburg surrendered on July 4, 1863, leaving Port Hudson as the last remaining Confederate stronghold on the Mississippi River. General Banks accepted the surrender of the Confederate garrison at Port Hudson on July 9, ending the longest siege in U.S. military history. Control of the Mississippi River was the centerpiece of the Union strategy to win the war, and, with the surrender of Port Hudson, the Confederacy was now cut in two.

On August 5, 1864, Farragut won a great victory in the Battle of Mobile Bay. Mobile, Alabama, was then the Confederacy's last major open port on the Gulf of Mexico. The bay was heavily mined (tethered naval mines were then known as "torpedoes"). Farragut ordered his fleet to charge the bay. When the monitor  struck a mine and sank, the others began to pull back.

From his high perch, where he was lashed to the rigging of his flagship, USS Hartford, Farragut could see the ships pulling back. "Torpedoes", was the shouted reply. "Damn the torpedoes.", said Farragut, "Four bells, Captain Drayton, go ahead. Jouett, full speed." The bulk of the fleet succeeded in entering the bay. Farragut triumphed over the opposition of heavy batteries in Fort Morgan and Fort Gaines to defeat the squadron of Admiral Franklin Buchanan.

On December 21, 1864, Lincoln promoted Farragut to vice admiral, which made him the senior ranking officer in the United States Navy.

Post-Civil War service
After the Civil War, Farragut was elected a companion of the first class of the New York Commandery of the Military Order of the Loyal Legion of the United States on March 18, 1866, and assigned insignia number 231.  He served as the commander of the Commandery of New York from May 1866 until his death.

Farragut was promoted to full admiral on July 25, 1866, becoming the first U.S. Navy officer to hold that rank.

His last active service was in command of the European Squadron, from 1867 to 1868, with the screw frigate  as his flagship. Farragut remained on active duty for life, an honor accorded to only seven other U.S. Navy officers after the Civil War.

Death

Farragut died from a heart attack at the age of 69 in Portsmouth, New Hampshire, while on vacation in the late summer of 1870. He had served almost sixty years in the navy.  He is interred at Woodlawn Cemetery, in The Bronx, New York City. His gravesite is listed on the National Register of Historic Places, as is Woodlawn Cemetery itself.

Personal life
After appointment and an initial cruise as acting lieutenant commanding , Farragut married Susan Caroline Marchant on September 2, 1824. After years of ill health, Susan Farragut died on December 27, 1840. Farragut was noted for his kindly treatment of his wife during her illness.

After the death of his first wife, Farragut married Virginia Dorcas Loyall, on December 26, 1843, with whom he had one surviving son, named Loyall Farragut, born October 12, 1844. Loyall Farragut graduated from West Point in 1868, and served as a second lieutenant in the U.S. Army before resigning in 1872.  He spent most of the remainder of his career as an executive with the Central Railroad Company of New Jersey.  He was a hereditary member of the Military Society of the War of 1812 and a companion of the Military Order of the Loyal Legion of the United States.  Loyall died on October 1, 1916, as noted on one side of the family monument that he and his mother erected to the memory of his father in Woodlawn Cemetery.

Farragut had a brother named William A. C. Farragut.  William was also in the Navy but had a far less distinguished career.  He was warranted as a midshipman on January 16, 1809 (a year before David Farragut would begin his career) and was promoted to lieutenant on December 9, 1814.  William remained at that rank until he was transferred to the Reserve List on December 15, 1855.  He died on December 20, 1859.

David Farragut was initiated to the Scottish Rite Masonry.

Timeline of service

 Spring 1810, added to U.S. Navy rolls as boy seaman
 December 17, 1810, appointed midshipman at age 9.
 1812, assigned to the frigate .
 1815–1817, served in the Mediterranean Sea aboard the ship of the line  and the frigate USS Macedonian.
 1818, studied ashore for nine months at Tunis.
 1819, served as a lieutenant on the schooner .
 1823, placed in command of the schooner .
 January 10, 1825, promoted to lieutenant on the frigate .
 1826–1838, served in subordinate capacities on various vessels.
 1838, placed in command of the sloop-of-war .
 September 8, 1841, promoted to the rank of commander.
 Mexican–American War, commanded the sloop-of-war . 
 1848–1853, duty at Norfolk Navy Yard in Portsmouth, Virginia, as Assistant Inspector of Ordinance.
 September 1852 – August 1853, assigned to superintend the testing of the endurance of naval gun batteries at Old Point Comfort at Fort Monroe in Virginia.
 1853–1854, duty at Washington, D.C.
 September 14, 1855, promoted to the rank of captain.
 1854–1858, duty establishing Mare Island Navy Yard at San Francisco Bay in California.
 1858–1859, commander of the screw sloop-of-war .
 1860–1861, stationed at Norfolk Navy Yard.
 January 13, 1862, promoted to the rank of flag officer (equivalent to commodore).
 January 1862, commanded the screw sloop-of-war  and the West Gulf Blockading Squadron of 17 vessels.
 April 1862, took command of occupied New Orleans, Louisiana.
 June 23, 1862, wounded near Vicksburg, Mississippi.
 July 16, 1862, promoted to rear admiral.
 March 15, 1863, commanded naval forces at the Battle of Port Hudson.
 May 1863, commanded the screw sloop-of-war .
 May 1863, commanded the screw steamer .
 July 1863, commanded the sidewheel paddle steamer USS Tennessee.
 August 5, 1864, Battle of Mobile Bay.
 September 5, 1864, offered command of the North Atlantic Blockading Squadron, but he declined because of family issues.
 December 21, 1864, promoted to vice admiral.
 April 1865, pallbearer for the funeral of Abraham Lincoln.
 July 25, 1866, promoted to admiral.
 June 1867–1868, commanded the European Squadron with the screw frigate  as his flagship.
 August 14, 1870, died at Portsmouth Navy Yard in Kittery, Maine.

Legacy
The area formerly known as Campbell's Station, Tennessee, only a few miles from Admiral Farragut's birthplace, was renamed to the town of Farragut in his honor.

Farragut Square in Washington, D.C. is named in his honor. A statue of him, named Admiral David G. Farragut, is in the center of Farragut Square. Two Washington Metro stations, Farragut West and Farragut North, also share his name. There is a statue of Admiral Farragut at the South Boston Marine Park adjacent to Castle Island. There is also an outdoor sculpture of him in Madison Square Park in Manhattan, New York City, where the Farragut section of the Borough of Brooklyn, including Farragut Road, is named for him.

Farragut Naval Training Station, located in Northern Idaho on Lake Pend Oreille, was a World War II naval training center with over 293,000 sailors receiving basic training there. In 1966, the state of Idaho turned the land into Farragut State Park.

Two separate classes of U.S. Navy destroyers have been named for Farragut: the Farragut class of 1934 and the Farragut class of 1958. Other U.S. Navy ships named Farragut include TB-11 of 1898, DD-300 of 1920, and DDG-99 of 2006.

Admiral Farragut Academy, named after Admiral David G. Farragut, was founded in 1933 as an all-boys military boarding high school located in St. Petersburg, Florida. Today, the Academy is a college-prep private school which serves students from PreK-12th grade. The Upper School, which starts in 8th grade, is also known worldwide for its Boarding program and Navy Junior ROTC military structure. Farragut also offers other signature academic programs: Aviation, Scuba, Marine Science, Engineering, Sailing, and more.  
Farragut Career Academy Chicago, IL and Farragut High School, Farragut TN;

Few naval officers in American history have been honored on a U.S. postage stamp, but David Farragut has been so honored more than once. The first postage stamp (at left) to honor Farragut was the 1-dollar black issue of 1903. The Navy Issue of 1937 includes (among five in a series) a 3-cent purple stamp which depicts Admirals David Farragut (left) and David Porter, with a warship under sail displayed at center. The most recent postage issue honoring Farragut was released from Gettysburg, Pennsylvania on June 29, 1995.

The Science Fiction Venturer Twelve series features an Admiral Farragut in command of Earth's Space Navy in the far future.

The Tennessee State Capitol Commission and Historical Commission voted on July 22, 2021, to move a bust of Admiral Farragut, as well as busts of Nathan Bedford Forrest and Admiral Albert Gleaves, from the Tennessee Capitol to the Tennessee State Museum. The process of moving them officially began on July 23, 2021.

Numerous places and things are named in remembrance of Admiral Farragut:
 Admiral Farragut Academy is a college preparatory school with naval training founded in 1933 by navy admirals in Pine Beach, New Jersey. In 1945 the current and now only campus opened in St. Petersburg, Florida.  In 1946 it was designated by Congress as a Naval Honor School.
 Farragut, Tennessee, Admiral Farragut's hometown of Campbell's Station (see Battle of Campbell's Station), Tennessee, was renamed Farragut when it became incorporated in 1982.  Admiral Farragut was actually born at Lowe's Ferry on the Holston (now Tennessee) River a few miles southeast of the town, but at that time Campbell's Station was the nearest settlement.
 Farragut Square in Washington, D.C. is named in his honor.
 Farragut High School was built at Admiral Farragut's home town of Campbell's Station (now Farragut) in 1904. Today Farragut High School, boasting nearly 2,500 students, is one of the largest schools in Tennessee. The school's colors are blue and white, and its sporting teams are known as "The Admirals".
 Farragut, a neighborhood in Brooklyn
 Farragut Field is a sports field at the United States Naval Academy.
 Farragut Career Academy in Chicago, Illinois is a high school in the Chicago Public Schools system that was founded in 1894; its sporting teams are also known as the Admirals. The school displays an oil painting of the admiral, presented to the school by the Farragut Post of the Grand Army of the Republic in 1896. NBA star Kevin Garnett attended Farragut Career Academy. Wheel of Fortune host Pat Sajak is also a prominent alum.
 Farragut, Iowa is a small farming town in southwestern Iowa. Admiral Farragut's famous slogan greets visitors from a billboard on the edge of town. The local school, Farragut Community High School, fielded varsity "Admiral" and JV "Sailor" teams until its closure in 2016. The school also houses memorabilia from the ships that have borne the Farragut name.
 Five U.S. Navy destroyers have been named , including two class leaders.
 
 Farragut Square, a park in Washington, D.C.; the square lends its name to two nearby Metro stations: Farragut North and Farragut West.
 Three U.S. postage stamps: the $1 stamp of 1903, the $0.03 stamp with Admiral David Porter in 1937 and a $0.32 stamp in 1995.
 100-dollar Treasury notes, also called coin notes, of the Series 1890 and 1891, feature portraits of Farragut on the obverse. The 1890 Series note is called a $100 Watermelon Note by collectors, because the large zeroes on the reverse resemble the pattern on a watermelon.
 A stained glass window in the United States Naval Academy Chapel depicts Farragut in the rigging of USS Hartford at Mobile Bay.
 David Glasgow Farragut High School is the U.S. Department of Defense High School located on the Naval Station in Rota, Spain. Their sporting teams are also known as "The Admirals".
 Farragut Parkway in Hastings-on-Hudson, New York.
 Farragut Middle School in Hastings-on-Hudson, New York.
 David Farragut School in Philadelphia
 A grade school in Mayagüez, Puerto Rico.
 A grade school (PS 44) in the Bronx.
 Farragut State Park in Idaho, which was used as a naval base for basic training during World War II.
 A hotel in Menorca at Cala'n Forcat.
 A bust in full naval regalia on the top floor of the Tennessee State Capitol.
 Admiral Farragut condominium on waterway in Coral Gables, Florida.
 Farragut elementary school in Vallejo Ca. Located just outside the Mare Island Gate.
 A monument is located off Northshore Drive in Concord, Tennessee. The monument reads "BIRTHPLACE OF ADMIRAL FARRAGUT/BORN JULY 5, 1801 . . . DEDICATED BY ADMIRAL DEWEY, MAY 15, 1900".
 The David Farragut School is an elementary school in Boston, Massachusetts
 The Farragut House bar–restaurant located in South Boston, Massachusetts.
 A larger than life statue near the beach in South Boston.
 Farragut Bay, Alaska, by Thomas, 1887 [Latitude: 57.11889 : Longitude: -133.23056]
 Farragut Inn at Touro University California located on the Mare Island Naval Shipyard.
Monuments
 Madison Square Park, New York City, by Augustus Saint Gaudens, 1881, replica in Cornish, New Hampshire, 1994
 Farragut Square, Washington, D.C., by Vinnie Ream, 1881
 Marine Park, Boston Massachusetts, by Henry Hudson Kitson, 1881
 Hackley Park, Muskegon, Michigan, by Charles Niehaus, 1900

 A "Commodore Farragut", who is clearly based on David Farragut, appears in Jules Verne's 1870 novel Twenty Thousand Leagues Under the Sea.
 In the Star Trek franchise, a number of Starfleet starships are named Farragut.
 The album Damn the Torpedoes by Tom Petty and the Heartbreakers is named after David Farragut's famous quote.
 The album MDFMK by MDFMK contains a song entitled "Damn the Torpedoes".
 In the comedy film Galaxy Quest, Tim Allen's character says "Never give up! Never surrender! Damn the resonance cannons! Full speed ahead!"
 Farragut is played by actor Scott Brady in the feature film Yankee Buccaneer (1952)
 In her 2010 spoken-word debut, Olivia Hedrick released a track "How I love thee Mister Farragut"
 In the 1943 film The More the Merrier, Charles Coburn views the famous quote on a statue, and uses the phrase as a motto; it drives the plot forward.
 In the video game The Elder Scrolls 4: Oblivion, there is a Fort Farragut.
 In the opening scene of Damages, Season 2, Episode 10, Ellen Parsons and Wes Krulik meet to talk on the left-side seating within the Admiral Farragut Memorial in Madison Square, Manhattan.
 Among his last acting roles, Ronald W. Reagan played Farragut in the 1965 episode "The Battle of San Francisco Bay" of the syndicated western television series, Death Valley Days. The episode focuses on the 1856 San Francisco Vigilance Committee. June Dayton was cast in the episode as Farragut's second wife, Virginia.
 Farragut is mentioned in The Wild Wild West episode "The Night of the Kraken", although he does not appear. At the climax, the story's villains try to destroy Farragut's ship with a naval mine, but are foiled by the series' heroes.
 In season 4 episode 13 of M*A*S*H entitled "Soldier of the Month", Hawkeye asks the question, "What famous Civil War hero said, 'Damn the torpedoes! Full steam ahead!'?" Klinger replied, "Tugarraf", which is Farragut backwards.

See also
 Bibliography of Naval history of the American Civil War
 Bibliography of early American naval history
 Blockade runners of the American Civil War
 Naval battles of the American Civil War
 Seth Ledyard Phelps (Naval commander who also served in naval operations in the Western Rivers Fleet)

Notes

References

Bibliography
  Url
  Url
  Url
 
  Url
 
  Url
 
  Url
 
  E'Book 
  E'Book
  Url
  Url
  Url
  Url

Further reading
  Url
  Url
 Hearn, Chester G. (1995) The Capture of New Orleans 1862, Louisiana State University Press, Baton Rouge, Louisiana, pp. 292 , Url
 Nash, Howard Pervear (1972). A naval history of the Civil WarA. S. Barnes, p. 375, Url
  Url

External links

 United States Naval History and Heritage Command, David Glasgow Farragut biography
 National Park Service biography and Vicksburg battle info
 archive of Farragut biography on INSURV at navy.mil
 Idaho's Farragut State Park
 Admiral Farragut Academy Alumni Site
 
 
 David G. Farragut Letterbook and Papers, 1862-1864 at The Historic New Orleans Collection 

1801 births
1870 deaths
 
19th-century American naval officers
American folklore
United States Navy personnel of the War of 1812
United States Navy personnel of the Mexican–American War
American people of Spanish descent
American people of Scotch-Irish descent
Burials at Woodlawn Cemetery (Bronx, New York)
Hall of Fame for Great Americans inductees
People from Hastings-on-Hudson, New York
People from Knoxville, Tennessee
People of Tennessee in the American Civil War
Southern Unionists in the American Civil War
Union Navy admirals
United States Navy commodores
War of 1812 prisoners of war held by the United Kingdom
Farragut, Tennessee
People from Farragut, Tennessee